Christopher John Fields (born September 23, 1968) is a Los Angeles-based director, teacher, and actor. He is the artistic director of the award-winning Echo Theater Company, a theatre he founded in 1997.

Early life
Fields was born in New York City in 1968 to Sidney and Dorthy Fields.

Film and television
Fields is frequently cast by director David Fincher and has appeared in Fincher's films Zodiac, Fight Club, The Game and Alien 3.

He is also known in Film for his work in Apollo 13, Jurassic Park, Stargate and Jacob's Ladder. He has appeared on TV in Sleepercell, ER, NYPD Blue, Boston Public, Ally McBeal and The Guardian.

Directing work in film includes his adaptation of Neal Bell's Out the Window, and his short Sunnyslope, which was awarded Best New York Film at the New York Film and Video Festival and nominated for Best in Fest at the Great Lakes Film Festival.

Theatre
Fields has appeared on Broadway (Homefront), Off Broadway (Machinal at the Public, Aristocrats at Manhattan Theater Club, Orphans with Steppenwolf) and has numerous regional credits, among them: Golden Boy, All My Sons, The Marriage of Bette and Boo, and 2.

Directing
Fields directed the premieres of Peter Sinn Nachtrieb's "Bob", Gary Lennon's "A Family Thing", Jessica Goldberg's "Body Politic" (Ovation nominated), Kate Robin's "What They Have" at South Coast Rep, Kate Robin's "Anon" at The Echo, Sarah Ruhl's "Melancholy Play", Paul Zimmerman's "Pigs and Bugs", and "Eat Me" by Jacqueline Wright, which was nominated for six LA Weekly Awards including Best Director and Ensemble. As a director, he's worked with and staged plays by Adam Rapp, Christopher Durang, David Lindsay-Abaire, Ellen McLaughlin, Napoleon Ellsworth, Padraic Duffy, Bernardo Solano, Deborah Pryor, Neal Bell, Kira Obolensky, Herman Daniel Farrell III, Quincy Long, and Karl Gajdusek, among many others. Chris produced the Echo production of Bryan Davidson's "War Music" at the Los Angeles Theater Center, which won three Ovation Awards including one for Best Premiere Play and one for Best Ensemble.

Chris was founder and Artistic Director of the Ojai Playwrights Conference from 1996 to 2000. He was asked by the board to leave this position, after programming plays that were not "diverse ethnically."

External links

Footnotes

1968 births
Living people
Male actors from New York City
American artistic directors
American film directors
American male actors